Southwark London Borough Council is the local authority for the London Borough of Southwark in Greater London, England. It is a London borough council, one of 32 in the United Kingdom capital of London.

History

There have previously been a number of local authorities responsible for the Southwark area. The current local authority was first elected in 1964, a year before formally coming into its powers and prior to the creation of the London Borough of Southwark on 1 April 1965. Southwark replaced the Metropolitan Borough of Southwark, the Metropolitan Borough of Camberwell and the Metropolitan Borough of Bermondsey.

It was envisaged that through the London Government Act 1963 Southwark as a London local authority would share power with the Greater London Council. The split of powers and functions meant that the Greater London Council was responsible for "wide area" services such as fire, ambulance, flood prevention, and refuse disposal; with the local authorities responsible for "personal" services such as social care, libraries, cemeteries and refuse collection. This arrangement lasted until 1986 when Southwark London Borough Council gained responsibility for some services that had been provided by the Greater London Council, such as waste disposal. Southwark became an education authority in 1990. Since 2000 the Greater London Authority has taken some responsibility for highways and planning control from the council, but within the English local government system the council remains a "most purpose" authority in terms of the available range of powers and functions.

Powers and functions
The local authority derives its powers and functions from the London Government Act 1963 and subsequent legislation, and has the powers and functions of a London borough council. It sets council tax and as a billing authority also collects precepts for Greater London Authority functions and business rates. It sets planning policies which complement Greater London Authority and national policies, and decides on almost all planning applications accordingly. It is a local education authority and is also responsible for council housing, social services, libraries, waste collection and disposal, traffic, and most roads and environmental health. From 2006, Southwark commenced implementation of a master data management system in conjunction with IBM UK Ltd., intending to rationalise "a number of disparate computerised systems" in use across the range of functions for which the Council was responsible. The project was abandoned after concerns that the recommended system adopted by Southwark was not satisfactory, but the Council was unsuccessful in its claim against IBM for breach of contract.

Universal Credit: criticism
Southwark was one of the first areas where Universal Credit was fully introduced. The Council issued a report in 2018 which was strongly critical of Universal Credit. Rent arrears among council tenants on Universal Credit are much higher than arrears among tenants on traditional benefits. Among two groups of council tenants investigated increase in arrears per claimant averaged between £586 and £309. The report disputed claims by ministers that rent arrears are temporary and notes that there are also arrears from tenants who have been on Universal Credit for over a year. Tenants who have been on Universal Credit for 15 months underpay rent by 7% on average. The report claims, "For now, the government must acknowledge that the current system is unworkable and broken. We strongly argue that the rollout of UC should be halted until radical steps are taken to fix the ongoing issues outlined in this research." Also use of food banks in Southwark has risen by 30% from 2017 to 2018 since Universal Credit was introduced there and 80% of the increase is attributed to Universal Credit. Victoria Mills of Southwark Council said, "Any delay to payments for those who are already under immense financial pressure will result in unrecoverable debt and unacceptable stress on people's lives. (...) A year on from our first research, the issues have simply got worse. We have to act on this evidence now and look at how we can support our residents and the pressure on our services. This situation is echoed across the country.  The government needs to take rapid steps to fix universal credit or acknowledge that they have created a system that is unworkable and broken."

See also
Southwark local elections 
London Mutual Credit Union

References

External links 
London Borough of Southwark website

Local authorities in London
London borough councils
Politics of the London Borough of Southwark
Leader and cabinet executives
Local education authorities in England
Billing authorities in England